Miami Valley is an unincorporated community in Peach County, in the U.S. state of Georgia.

History
The community's name is derived from the Miami Indians.

References

Unincorporated communities in Peach County, Georgia